Boondooma Dam is a dam on the Boyne River on the boundary of Boondooma and Proston in the South Burnett Region of Queensland, Australia.  In 1983, the dam was constructed across the Boyne River below its confluence with the Stuart River, creating Lake Boondooma.

The dam forms a narrow and deep lake, designed to avoid evaporation, with one fork containing much standing timber and another having many submerged rocky outcrops.

The dam overflowed for the first time in May 1983. It reached a low of 0% capacity in October 2015, after having reached a maximum of 173.8% (6.17m over the spillway) in January 2013 as a result of heavy rain from ex Tropical Cyclone Oswald.

Water supply
It was built to supply water to the Tarong Power Station and as is the case at so many impoundments, takes its name from the original property in the area. The dam also supplies water to irrigate agricultural properties in the area.

Typically, the dam supplies between 50 million and 80 million litres of water per day to Tarong Power Station. The dam was connected to the Western Corridor Recycled Water Project to ensure water levels would not interfere with power generation in times of drought.

SunWater, the dam's managing authority, is undertaking a dam spillway capacity upgrade program to ensure the highest level of safety for dams under their jurisdiction is maintained. The spillway will be upgraded in the longer term.

Recreation
Since March 2001, camping and recreational facilities at the dam have been managed by the Wondai Shire Council, and since council amalgamations, South Burnett Regional Council. Self-contained cabins, caravan sites and camping are all available by the lake. There are also multiple picnic grounds for day-trippers. Angling, swimming, sailing and water skiing are all popular activities at Boondooma Dam.

Fishing
The dam is stocked with bass, golden perch, silver perch and barramundi, while eel-tailed catfish, and bony bream are present naturally. A Stocked Impoundment Permit is required to fish in the dam. In 1993 and 1994, more than 60,000 barramundi were released into the dam,  thought the furthest south that the species could survive. Limited numbers have been caught since, but greater success was achieved at locations closer to the coast of similar latitude.

Boating
The dam has two boat ramps and a boating permit is not required. There are no boating restrictions on the dam, however a no fishing/boating zone applies around the dam wall.

See also

List of dams and reservoirs in Australia

References

External links
Lake Boondooma Fishing Information, Map, pictures & Water Level Gauge

Reservoirs in Queensland
Dams completed in 1983
Wide Bay–Burnett
Dams in Queensland
South Burnett Region